Staņislavs Olijars (born 22 March 1979 in Chelyabinsk, RSFSR, Soviet Union) is a retired Latvian athlete mainly competing in the 110 metres hurdles. He is the 2000 European indoor champion, and in 2002 he won European indoor and outdoor medals. His best Olympic performance was in 2004, finishing 5th. In 2006 he became European champion in the event. In 2013 he retired.

Personal bests
100 metres - 10.42 (2002)
200 metres - 20.91 (2003)
110 metres hurdles - 13.08 (2003)

Competition record

References

External links

1979 births
Living people
Soviet emigrants to Latvia
Sportspeople from Chelyabinsk
Latvian male hurdlers
Olympic male hurdlers
Olympic athletes of Latvia
Athletes (track and field) at the 2000 Summer Olympics
Athletes (track and field) at the 2004 Summer Olympics
Athletes (track and field) at the 2008 Summer Olympics
World Athletics Championships athletes for Latvia
European Athletics Championships medalists